UoSAT-5, also known as UoSAT-F, UO-22 and OSCAR 22, is a British satellite in Low Earth Orbit. It was built by Surrey Satellite Technology and launched into space in July 1991 from French Guiana.

Mission
UoSAT-5 carries equipment that was similar to that on UoSAT-4, a similar satellite that failed in orbit 1 year previously. The satellite tested new technologies, including validating the performance of Gallium arsenide solar arrays.

References 

University of Surrey
Satellites orbiting Earth
Amateur radio satellites
Satellites of the United Kingdom
Spacecraft launched in 1991